Krishnagiri is a state assembly constituency in Tamil Nadu, India. Its State Assembly Constituency number is 53. It is a part of the similarly named constituency for national elections to the Parliament of India. This constituency is delimited in the year 2008. It is one of the 234 State Legislative Assembly Constituencies in Tamil Nadu in India.

Krishnagiri was one of 17 assembly constituencies to have VVPAT facility with EVMs in 2016 Tamil Nadu Legislative Assembly election.

It comprises the following areas.
 Krishnagiri Taluk (Part) - Polupalli, Kurubarapalli, Ragimaganapalli, Junjupalli, Byanapalli, Kothapetta, Kattinayanapalli, Kammaampalli, Boganapalli, Pethathalapalli, Gangaleri, Kondepalli, Kompalli, Sembadamuthur, Gooliam, Bellampalli, Chikkapoovathi, Thandegoundanahalli, Alapatti, Agaram, Marikkampalli, Bellarampalli, Periyamuthur, Devasamudiram, Agasipalli, Chowttahalli, Sundekuppam, Timmapuram, Katteri, Gundalapatti, Sokkadi, Velakalahalli, Chaparthi, Bannihalli, Mittahalli, Errahalli, Kaveripattinam, Paiyur, Jagadab, Kallukurukki and Karadihalli villages.
 Krishnagiri Municipality & Kattiganapalli
 Kaveripattinam Town Panchayat

Madras State

Tamil Nadu

Election results

2021

2016

2011

2006

2001

1996

1991

1989

1984

1980

1977

1971

1967

1962

1957

1952

References 

 

Assembly constituencies of Tamil Nadu
Krishnagiri district